Wake Up and Dream is a 1946 Technicolor musical fantasy film directed by Lloyd Bacon, written by Elick Moll, and starring June Haver and John Payne. The flm was released by 20th Century Fox and was based on the novel The Enchanted Voyage by Robert Nathan.The Enchanted Voyage was the working title and the title of the film in the United Kingdom.

Plot

Jeff Cairn enlists in the Navy. He puts younger sister Nella in a cousin's care where she will be sent to a convent. Nella runs away back to the boarding house where they lived and where old Henry Pecket let her work on his sloop, docked out back.

A waitress, Jeff's sweetheart Jenny, agrees to move into Sara March's boarding house to look after the girl. Sara mistakenly believes Henry is inviting women aboard his boat and sells Henry's boat as an act of revenge. Jeff is reported to be missing in action, while the sloop with Henry, Nella and Jenny aboard and is caught in a storm and drifts far away in a flood. Nella doesn't believe that Jeff is dead and believes with all her heart that they will find Jeff on a dream island on their enchanted voyage.

Cast

Soundtrack
 "Give Me the Simple Life" 
Music by Rube Bloom
Lyrics by Harry Ruby
Sung by John Payne and June Haver
I Wish I Could Tell You
Music by Rube Bloom
Lyrics by Harry Ruby
 Into the Sun
Music by Rube Bloom
Lyrics by Harry Ruby
 Bell Bottom Trousers
Music traditional
Lyrics by Harry Ruby
 We're Off to See the Wizard
Lyrics by E.Y. Harburg
Music by Harold Arlen

Reception
Nathan called the film "a wretched little thing."

References

External links 
 
 
 

1946 films
Films based on American novels
1940s fantasy films
20th Century Fox films
1946 drama films
Films directed by Lloyd Bacon
Films based on works by Robert Nathan
Films scored by Cyril J. Mockridge
American fantasy drama films
1940s American films